In probability theory, a Subordinator is a stochastic process that is non-negative and whose increments are stationary and independent. Subordinators are a special class of Lévy process that play an important role in the theory of local time. In this context, subordinators describe the evolution of time within another stochastic process, the subordinated stochastic process. In other words, a subordinator will determine the random number of "time steps" that occur within the subordinated process for a given unit of chronological time.

In order to be a subordinator a process must be a Lévy process  It also must be increasing, almost surely, or an additive process.

Definition 
A subordinator is a real-valued stochastic process  that is a non-negative and a Lévy process.
Subordinators are the stochastic processes  that have all of the following properties: 
  almost surely
  is non-negative, meaning  for all 

Examples
The variance gamma process can be described as a Brownian motion subject to a gamma subordinator.  If a Brownian motion, with drift  is subjected to a random time change which follows a gamma process, the variance gamma process will follow:

 

The Cauchy process can be described as a Brownian motion subject to a Lévy subordinator.

Representation 
Every subordinator  can be written as

where
  is a scalar and

The measure  is called the Lévy measure of the subordinator, and the pair  is called the characteristics of the subordinator.

References

Stochastic processes